Renacimiento Fútbol Club is an Equatoguinean football club based in the city of Malabo. From 2004 to 2007, the club won 4 national titles. It was disestablished between 2009 and 2011, but returns for the 2012 season in Second Division.

Honours

Domestic
Equatoguinean Premier League: 4
2004, 2005, 2006, 2007

Performance in CAF competitions
CAF Champions League: 4 appearances
2005 – Preliminary Round
2006 – Second Round
2007 – Preliminary Round
2008 – Preliminary Round

CAF Confederation Cup: 1 appearance
2006 – Group stage

CAF Cup: 1 appearance
2003 – First Round

Notable players

 
Association football clubs disestablished in 2009
Football clubs in Equatorial Guinea
Sport in Malabo
2009 disestablishments in Equatorial Guinea